Kabirah Kafidipe  is a Nigerian film actress, director and producer. She is popularly known as “Araparegangan” for her role in  Saworoide, a 1999 Nigerian film produced and directed by Tunde Kelani.

Early life
Kafidipe was born on July 29. A native of Ikereku, a town in Abeokuta, the capital of Ogun State, southwestern Nigeria.
She attended Abeokuta Grammar School where she obtained the West Africa School Certificate before she proceeded to Olabisi Onabanjo University, where she received a bachelor's degree in Mass communication.

Career
Kabirah's first film appearance was in The White Handkerchief, a short film  adapted from The Virgin, a debut novel of Bayo Adebowale, produced and directed by Tunde Kelani but came into limelight when she featured in Saworoide, a 1999 Nigerian film that starred Kunle Afolayan, Peter Fatomilola, Kola Oyewo, Yemi Shodimu.
She later featured in a 2004 Nigerian film, titled The Campus Queen, The Narrow Path, a 2006 film that starred Sola Asedeko, Beautiful Nubia, directed by Tunde Kelani and produced by Mainframe Films and Television Productions. 
Her lead role in Iwalewa, a 2006 Nigerian film fetched her the Africa Movie Academy Awards of Best Actress in a Leading Role.
She starred in Dazzling Mirage, a 2014 Nigerian drama film, produced and directed by Tunde Kelani; it stars Kunle Afolayan, Bimbo Manuel, Yomi Fash Lanso, Taiwo Ajai Lycett.
She produced a film titled, Bintu which was premiered in R & A Hotel at Opebi in Ikeja, Lagos State.

Filmography

References

Actresses from Abeokuta
Living people
Nigerian film actresses
Nigerian television actresses
Yoruba actresses
Actresses in Yoruba cinema
20th-century Nigerian actresses
Olabisi Onabanjo University alumni
21st-century Nigerian actresses
Year of birth missing (living people)
Nigerian film producers
Nigerian film directors
Actresses from Ogun State